The Rinža (German: Rinse, Rinnse) is a river of Slovenia. It is the main watercourse of the Kočevje Polje and it is a losing stream. A few kilometers downstream of Kočevje, it goes subterranean. It emerges again as the Bilpa, a tributary of the Kolpa (Kupa).

See also 
List of rivers of Slovenia

References

Rivers of Lower Carniola